Hobro Stadium, known also as DS Arena for sponsorship purposes is a 7,500 capacity football stadium in Hobro, Denmark, which is the home ground of Hobro IK. The stadium is part of Hobro Idrætscenter, a sports centre also including two indoor halls, swimming pool and a gymnasium.

Capacity

 Jutland Bank Tribune : 2,250 seats + 1,400 standing rooms
 Pajo Bolte Tribunen : 1,400 standing rooms
 SparNord Tribunen : 750 seats + 100 standing rooms
 standing rooms outside of tribune : 3,325 (Nord-West) + 800 (South-East)

References

External links
 Official website of Hobro Idrætscenter

Football venues in Denmark
Buildings and structures in Mariagerfjord Municipality